Beatrix Tóth (born 10 March 1967) is a retired Hungarian handball player. She won a silver medal at the 1995 World Championships and a bronze at the 1996 Olympics.

References

1967 births
Living people
People from Szabadszállás
Hungarian female handball players
Olympic handball players of Hungary
Handball players at the 1996 Summer Olympics
Olympic bronze medalists for Hungary
Olympic medalists in handball
Medalists at the 1996 Summer Olympics
Sportspeople from Bács-Kiskun County